Mohammed Tayeb Al Alawi (born 13 October 1989) is a Bahrain association footballer currently playing for Al-Najma and the Bahrain national football team as a striker.

Career
Al Alawi has played for Al-Najma since 2008, and scored 28 goals for the club.

International career
To date, Al Alawai has made 8 appearances for the Bahrain national football team scoring 5 goals. 3 of which, came during the 2014 FIFA World Cup qualification – AFC Third Round, which Bahrain failed to qualify out of the group stage. He was a member of the Bahrain squad that won the 2011 Pan Arab Games and scored a goal in the semi-final against Palestine.

International goals
Scores and results list Bahrain's goal tally first.

Honours

International
Bahrain
Pan Arab Games (1): 2011

Club
Al-Najma
Bahraini Super Cup (1) : 2008
Bahraini King's Cup (1) : 2018

References

1989 births
Living people
Bahraini footballers
Bahrain international footballers
2015 AFC Asian Cup players
Sportspeople from Manama

Association football forwards